Formica pressilabris is a species of ant belonging to the family Formicidae.

It is native to Europe.

References

pressilabris
Insects described in 1846